Josef Jech (4 October 1886 – 19 November 1957) was an Austrian footballer. He played in two matches for the Austria national football team in 1908.

References

External links
 

1886 births
1957 deaths
Austrian footballers
Austria international footballers
Place of birth missing
Association footballers not categorized by position